This is a list of diplomatic missions of Malawi.

Malawi's Former President Muluzi continued the pro-Western foreign policy established by his predecessor, Hastings Banda. It maintains excellent diplomatic relations with principal Western countries. Malawi's close relations with South Africa throughout the apartheid era strained its relations with other African nations. Following the collapse of apartheid in 1994, Malawi developed, and currently maintains, strong diplomatic relations with all African countries.

Honorary consulates are excluded from this listing.

Current missions

Africa

Americas

Asia

Europe

Multilateral organisations

Gallery

Missions to open 

 Jerusalem (Embassy)

Closed missions

Africa

Asia

See also
Foreign relations of Malawi
List of diplomatic missions in Malawi
Visa policy of Malawi

Notes

References

External links
Ministry of Foreign Affairs

Malawi
 
Diplomatic missions